This is a list of administrative villages of Jakarta.

Central Jakarta

Gambir 
Gambir 
Kebon Kelapa 
Petojo Selatan 
Duri Pulo 
Cideng 
Petojo Utara

Cempaka Putih 
Cempaka Putih Timur
Cempaka Putih Barat 
Rawasari

Johar Baru 
Galur 
Tanah Tinggi 
Kampung Rawa 
Johar Baru

Kemayoran 
Gunung Sahari Selatan
Kemayoran 
Kebon Kosong
Cempaka Baru
Harapan Mulya 
Sumur Batu 
Serdang 
Utan Panjang

Menteng 
Menteng 
Pegangsaan 
Cikini
Kebon Sirih
Gondangdia

Sawah Besar 
Pasar Baru 
Gunung Sahari Utara
Mangga Dua Selatan
Karang Anyar
Kartini

Tanah Abang 
Bendungan Hilir 
Karet Tengsin 
Kebon Melati 
Kebon Kacang 
Kampung Bali 
Petamburan 
Gelora

West Jakarta

Cengkareng
Kedaung Kali Angke 
Kapuk 
Cengkareng Barat
Cengkareng Timur 
Rawa Buaya 
Duri Kosambi

Grogol Petamburan
Tomang
Grogol 
Jelambar 
Jelambar Baru 
Wijaya Kusuma 
Tanjung Duren Utara
Tanjung Duren Selatan

Kalideres
Kamal - area code 11810
Tegal Alur - area code 11820
Pegadungan - area code 11830
Kalideres - area code 11840
Semanan - area code 11850

Kebon Jeruk
Duri Kepa - area code 11510
Kedoya Selatan - area code 11520
Kedoya Utara - area code 11520
Kebon Jeruk - area code 11530
Sukabumi Utara - area code 11540
Kelapa Dua - area code 11550
Sukabumi Selatan - area code 11560

Kembangan
 Kembangan Utara - area code 11610 
 Kembangan Selatan - area code 11610 
 Meruya Utara - area code 11620 
 Srengseng - area code 11630 
 Joglo - area code 11640 
 Meruya Selatan - area code 11650

Palmerah
Slipi - area code 11410 
Kota Bambu Utara - area code 11420 
Kota Bambu Selatan - area code 11420
Jatipulo - area code 11430 
Palmerah - area code 11480 
Kemanggisan - area code 11480

Taman Sari
Pinangsia - area code 11110 
Glodok - area code 11120. The area is Jakarta's oldest and largest China town. 
Keagungan - area code 11130 
Krukut - area code 11140 
Taman Sari - area code 11150 
Maphar - area code 11160 
Tangki - area code 11170 
Mangga Besar - area code 11180

Tambora
Tanah Sareal - area code 11210 
Tambora - area code 11220 
Roa Malaka - area code 11230 
Pekojan - area code  11240 
Jembatan Lima - area code 11250 
Krendang - area code 11260 
Duri Utara - area code 11270 
Duri Selatan - area code  11270 
Kali Anyar - area code 11310 
Jembatan Besi - area code 11320 
Angke - area code 11330

North Jakarta

Cilincing
Kali Baru – area code 14110
Cilincing – area code 14120
Semper Barat – area code 14130
Semper Timur – area code 14130
Sukapura – area code 14140
Rorotan – area code 14140
Marunda – area code 14150

Koja
Koja Utara - area code 14210
Koja Selatan - area code 14220
Rawa Badak Utara - area code 14230
Rawa Badak Selatan - area code 14230
Tugu Utara - area code 14260
Tugu Selatan - area code 14260
Lagoa - area code 14270

Kelapa Gading
Kelapa Gading Barat - area code 14240
Kelapa Gading Timur - area code 14240
Pegangsaan Dua - area code 14250

Tanjung Priok
Tanjung Priok - area code 14310
Kebon Bawang - area code 14320
Sungai Bambu - area code 14330
Papanggo - area code 14340
Warakas - area code 14340
Sunter Agung - area code 14350
Sunter Jaya - area code 14350

Pademangan
Pademangan Timur - area code 14410
Pademangan Barat - area code 14420
Ancol - area code 14430

Penjaringan
Penjaringan - area code 14440
Pluit - area code 14450
Pejagalan - area code 14450
Kapuk Muara - area code 14460
Kamal Muara - area code 14470

East Jakarta

Cakung
Cakung Timur - area code 13910
Cakung Barat - area code 13910
Rawa Terate - area code 13920
Jatinegara - area code 13930
Penggilingan - area code 13940
Pulogebang - area code 13950
Ujung Menteng - area code 13960

Cipayung
Lubang Buaya - area code 13810
Ceger - area code 13820
Cipayung - area code 13840
Munjul - area code 13850
Pondok Ranggon - area code 13860
Cilangkap - area code 13870
Setu - area code 13880
Bambu Apus - area code 13890

Ciracas
Cibubur - area code 13720
Kelapa Dua Wetan - area code 13730
Ciracas - area code 13740
Susukan - area code 13750
Rambutan - area code 13830

Duren Sawit
Pondok Bambu - area code 13430
Duren Sawit - area code 13440
Pondok Kelapa - area code 13450
Pondok Kopi - area code 13460
Malaka Jaya - area code 13460
Malaka Sari - area code 13460
Klender - area code 13470

Jatinegara
Bali Mester - area code 13310
Kampung Melayu - area code 13320
Bidaracina - area code 13330
Cipinang Cempedak - area code 13340
Rawa Bunga - area code 13350
Cipinang Besar Utara - area code 13410
Cipinang Besar Selatan - area code 13410
Cipinang Muara - area code 13420

Kramat Jati
Kramat Jati - area code 13510
Batuampar - area code 13520
Balekambang - area code 13530
Kampung Tengah - area code 13540
Dukuh - area code 13550
Cawang - area code 13630
Cililitan - area code 13640

Makasar
Pinang Ranti - area code 13560
Makasar - area code 13570
Halim Perdanakusuma - area code 13610
Cipinang Melayu - area code 13620
Kebon Pala - area code 13650

Matraman
Pisangan Baru - area code 13110
Utan Kayu Selatan - area code 13120
Utan Kayu Utara - area code 13120
Kayu Manis - area code 13130
Pal Meriam - area code 13140
Kebon Manggis - area code 13150

Pasar Rebo
Pekayon - area code 13710
Kampung Gedong - area code 13760
Cijantung - area code 13770
Kampung Baru - area code 13780
Kalisari - area code 13790

Pulo Gadung
Jatinegara Kaum - area code 13240
Pisangan Timur - area code 13230
Cipinang - area code 13250
Pulo Gadung - area code 13260
Kayu Putih - area code 13210
Jati - area code 13220
Rawamangun - area code 13220

South Jakarta

Cilandak
Cipete Selatan - area code 12410
Gandaria Selatan - area code 12420
Cilandak Barat - area code 12430
Lebak Bulus - area code 12440
Pondok Labu - area code 12450

Jagakarsa
Tanjung Barat – area code 12530
Lenteng Agung – area code 12610
Jagakarsa – area code 12620
Ciganjur – area code 12630
Srengseng Sawah – area code 12640
Cipedak – area code 12630

Kebayoran Baru
Selong - area code 12110
Gunung - area code 12120
Kramat Pela - area code 12130
Gandaria Utara - area code 12140
Cipete Utara - area code 12150
Pulo - area code 12160
Melawai - area code 12160
Petogogan - area code 12170
Rawa Barat - area code 12180
Senayan - area code 12190

Kebayoran Lama
Grogol Utara - area code 12210
Grogol Selatan - area code 12220
Cipulir - area code 12230
Kebayoran Lama Utara - area code 12240
Kebayoran Lama Selatan - area code 12240
Pondok Pinang - area code 12310

Mampang Prapatan
Kuningan Barat - area code 12710
Pela Mampang - area code 12720
Bangka - area code 12730
Tegal Parang - area code 12790
Mampang Prapatan - area code 12790

Pancoran
Kalibata - area code 12740
Rawa Jati - area code 12750
Duren Tiga - area code 12760
Cikoko - area code 12770
Pengadegan - area code 12770
Pancoran - area code 12780

Pasar Minggu
Pejaten Barat - area code 12510
Pejaten Timur - area code 12510
Pasar Minggu - area code 12520
Kebagusan - area code 12520
Jati Padang - area code 12540
Ragunan - area code 12550
Cilandak Timur - area code 12560

Pesanggrahan
Ulujami - area code 12250
Petukangan Utara - area code 12260
Petukangan Selatan - area code 12270
Pesanggrahan - area code 12320
Bintaro - area code 12330

Setiabudi
Setiabudi - area code 12910
Karet - area code 12920
Karet Semanggi - area code 12930
Karet Kuningan - area code 12940
Kuningan Timur - area code 12950
Menteng Atas - area code 12960
Pasar Manggis - area code 12970
Guntur - area code 12980

Tebet
Tebet Barat - area code 12810
Tebet Timur - area code 12820
Kebon Baru - area code 12830
Bukit Duri - area code 12840
Manggarai - area code 12850
Manggarai Selatan - area code 12860
Menteng Dalam - area code 12870

Administrative villages